Ravi Oad  is Nepalese singer, actor and dancer who rose to fame after winning the title and becoming the second season winner of Nepalese TV series Nepal Idol. Oad holds the title for Nepal Idol winner for the season two with Bikram Baral as runner up and Sumit Pathak as second runner up.

Career

Nepal Idol success 
Oad participated in Nepalese reality television show Nepal Idol and he managed to win the show with the prize of Pranish, 22  Lakhs NPR, and Honda WRV car along with world tour.

Filmography 

 Nepal Idol season 2 as Participant Ravi Oad

Tours 

 Nepal Idol Worldwide Tour (2018–present)
 Nepal Idol Japan Tour

References

Living people
21st-century Nepalese male singers
People from Kanchanpur District
Nepal Idol winners
Year of birth missing (living people)